Cycas clivicola is a species of cycad in Thailand, Cambodia, Vietnam, and Malaysia (including Perlis State Park). It is found on limestone outcrops, as well as on offshore islands.

References

clivicola
Plants described in 1999